McVickers may refer to:

 McVickers Theater, a lavish playhouse that was in Chicago, Illinois
 John McVickers, a 19th-century Irish footballer
McVickers, former name of Rainbow Crafts

See also
Noah McVicker, inventor of Play-Doh